The following is a list of heads of government of the members states of CARICOM:

Leaders 
 : Gaston Browne
 : Philip Davis
 : Mia Mottley
 : Johnny Briceño
 : Roosevelt Skerrit
 : Dickon Mitchell 
 : Mohamed Irfaan Ali
 : Ariel Henry
 : Andrew Holness
 : Easton Taylor-Farrell
 : Terrance Drew
 : Philip Pierre
 : Ralph Gonsalves
 : Chandrikapersad Santokhi
 : Keith Rowley

CARICOM Past Leaders
Only those persons who have been leaders since their country became a member of CARICOM are listed. The leaders are listed in order of their terms, with leaders serving twice only being listed in order of their first term:
 : Vere Cornwall Bird, Lester Bird and Baldwin Spencer
 : Lynden Pindling, Hubert Ingraham (twice), Perry Christie (twice) and Hubert Minnis
 : Errol Barrow (twice), Tom Adams, Bernard St. John, Erskine Sandiford, Owen Arthur, David Thompson, and Freundel Stuart
 : George Cadle Price (twice), Manuel Esquivel (twice), Said Musa and Dean Barrow
 : Edward Oliver LeBlanc, Patrick John, Oliver Seraphine, Dame Eugenia Charles, Edison James, Rosie Douglas, Pierre Charles and Osborne Riviere (acting)
 : Eric Gairy, Maurice Bishop, Herbert A. Blaize, Ben Jones, Nicholas Brathwaite, George Brizan, Keith Mitchell (twice) and Tillman Thomas
  1: Arthur Chung, Forbes Burnham, Desmond Hoyte, Cheddi Jagan, Sam Hinds, Janet Jagan, Bharrat Jagdeo  (twice), Donald Ramotar and David A. Granger
  2: Jean-Bertrand Aristide, René Préval, Michel Martelly, Jocelerme Privert (acting) and Jovenel Moïse
 : Michael Manley (twice), Edward Seaga, P. J. Patterson, Portia Simpson-Miller (twice), Bruce Golding and Andrew Holness (twice, also incumbent)
 : Percival Austin Bramble, John Osborne (twice), Reuben Meade (twice), Bertrand Osborne, David Brandt, Lowell Lewis and Donaldson Romeo
 : Robert L. Bradshaw, Paul Southwell, Lee Moore, Kennedy Simmonds and Denzil Douglas
 : John Compton (thrice), Allan Louisy, Winston Cenac, Michael Pilgrim (interim), Vaughan Lewis, Kenny Anthony (thrice), Stephenson King, and Allen Chastanet
 : James Fitz-Allen Mitchell (twice), Milton Cato and Arnhim Eustace
 : Ronald Venetiaan (twice), Jules Wijdenbosch and Desi Bouterse
 : Eric Williams, George Chambers, A.N.R. Robinson, Patrick Manning (twice), Basdeo Panday, Kamla Persad-Bissessar and Keith Rowley (twice, also incumbent)

Portfolios
Heads of Government have also established a Quasi-Cabinet arrangement to further advance specific issues/areas within the Community.  The decision to establish the Quasi-Cabinet was taken at their Seventh Special Meeting (October 1999, Trinidad and Tobago), convened to deliberate on a Vision for the future of the Region.  Within the Quasi-Cabinet, individual Heads of Government have responsibility for critical areas of Community Development.

The Quasi-Cabinet Portfolio allocation is set out overleaf.

As part of efforts to strengthen the Quasi-Cabinet functioning, Heads of Government undertook a review of the Portfolio allocations in July 2010, at their Thirty-First Regular Meeting held in Jamaica

These are some of the areas which have been assigned:  (both officially and by national special interest.) 
  ... Lead Head of Government for Services
  ... Lead Head of Government for Tourism (including Land, Cruise, ACP/EU Partnership Agreement provisions etc)
  ... Lead Head of Government for the CSME (including Monetary Union)
  ... Lead Head of Government for Justice and Governance
  ... Lead Head of Government for Labour (including intra-Community movement of skills)
  ... Lead Head of Government for Science and Technology (including Information and Communications)
  ... Lead Head of Government for Agriculture, Agricultural Diversification and Food Security (including the Regional Transformation Programme (RTP) and Bananas)
  ... Lead Head of Government for External Trade Negotiations
  ... Head of Government for Human Resource Development, Health and HIV/AIDS
  ... Lead Head of Government for Sustainable Development (including Environment and Disaster Management and Water)
  ... Lead Head of Government for Transport (Maritime and Aviation)
  ... Lead Head of Government for Community Development and Cultural Cooperation (including Culture, Gender, Youth and Sport)
  ... Lead Head of Government for Energy and Security

References

2. www.caricom.org

Footnotes
Note that for Guyana only the past Presidents are listed. In most instances the past Presidents of Guyana since it joined CARICOM were also past Prime Ministers at some point. Only Arthur Chung and Cheddi Jagan have never been Prime Ministers. Prime Ministers of Guyana (since it joined CARICOM) that were never Presidents at some point were  Ptolemy Reid, Hamilton Green and Moses Nagamootoo.
The head of the interim government in Haiti, which was installed under controversial circumstances had been suspended, (as of 2004) from the councils of the Caribbean Community and was not recognized as the legitimate government, hence its leaders aren't listed.

See also

List of Commonwealth prime ministers
List of current heads of state and government
List of state leaders by date

Caribbean Community
Heads of government in the Caribbean